Wandile Putuma (born 8 August 1990 in East London, South Africa) is a South African rugby union player for the  in the Currie Cup and in the Rugby Challenge. His regular position is lock.

Career

Youth

After high school, he joined the Border rugby academy; he was a member of the  side during the 2009 Under-19 Provincial Championship and of the s in the 2010 and 2011 editions of the Under-21 Provincial Championships.

Border Bulldogs

However, it wasn't until 2014 that he became involved in first class matches; he was one of several amateur club players brought into the  provincial set-up at the start of 2014 after the professional side was declared bankrupt. He scored a try in the 22nd minute of the match, his side's first points in the competition, in a 24–46 defeat in East London. However, he couldn't prevent the Border Bulldogs finishing bottom of the log.

The Border Bulldogs lost all six of their matches to qualify to the 2014 Currie Cup First Division. Putuma once again started the first two matches of the First Division campaign playing off the bench before starting their final three matches in the competition as the Bulldogs finished bottom of the log with a single win all season.

He returned for the Border Bulldogs in the 2015 Vodacom Cup and was a regular starter for them during the campaign.

References

1990 births
Living people
Border Bulldogs players
Rugby union locks
Rugby union players from East London, Eastern Cape
South African rugby union players